MKS (Switzerland) SA is a trader of precious metals. Based in Geneva, the group employs approximately 1000 workers.
MKS is an associate of the London Bullion Market Association (LBMA), and its subsidiary PAMP has been on the LBMA’s Gold List, widely recognised in the financial services industry as the indicator of quality, since 1987.

Areas of activity
As a trading house the company's clients include organisations in the financial services industry, such as banks and fund managers, commodities processors such as gold miners and jewellery manufacturers. MKS subsidiary PAMP SA (Produits Artistiques Metaux Precieux), based in Castel San Pietro in the Swiss canton of Ticino, is a refinery processing gold, silver, platinum and palladium. The refinery produces bars, coins and medallions from the precious metals it refines as well as providing semi-finished products to jewellers and watch manufacturers. It counts Harrods among its retail partners, which offers PAMP's minted products to its customers at its bank in its London flagship store.

History

The company was founded in Switzerland in 1979 by Mahmoud Kassem Shakarchi, hence the name MKS. His son and daughter jointly took over the running of the company in 1983, since when the company has expanded to have staff located in 15 offices in 12 countries around the world.

MKS bought PAMP SA in 1981, and began to supply gold bars to jewellers, high street banks, investments banks and central banks.

PAMP

PAMP SA (Produits Artistiques Métaux Précieux) is a world leading, independently operated, precious metals refining and fabricating company, member of the MKS Group. It was established in 1977 in Ticino, Switzerland. It provides vertically integrated services in precious metals, from collection of doré from the mine, through to assaying, hedging and delivery of its bars and other products throughout the world. The company produces a complete selection of bullion bars, from 12.5 kilograms to 1 gram and leads the world market for gold bars of 50 grams or less. PAMP also operates in India through MMTC-PAMP, a joint venture between the company and MMTC Ltd.

MKS in the media

MKS is often quoted as a gold trading expert in the media. Financial media such as Bloomberg, Businessweek, Financial Times, Reuters and the San Francisco Chronicle have quoted them.

References

External links 
Bullion Market Association, full members' list
Harrods to sell gold bullion for first time, The Telegraph, 15 October 2009.Partnership with PAMP
PAMP Shop, Goldavenue

Financial services companies of Switzerland